Pinaki is a given name. Notable people with the given name include:

Pinaki Chandra Ghose (born 1952), Indian judge
Pinaki Chaudhuri (born 1940), Indian tabla player, academic, and film director
Pinaki Majumdar (born 1964), Indian physicist 
Pinaki Misra (born 1959), Indian politician